British School of Bucharest (BSB) is a British international school in Voluntari, Ilfov County, Romania, in the Bucharest metropolitan area.

Established in 2000, the school welcomes more than 600 students each year, aged 2–18. The school serves from Pre-Nursery, up to Year 13.

References

External links

 British School of Bucharest

International schools in Romania
Bucharest
Schools in Ilfov County
2000 establishments in Romania
Educational institutions established in 2000